Silver on the Sage is a 1939 American Western film directed by Lesley Selander and written by Maurice Geraghty. Starring William Boyd, George "Gabby" Hayes, Russell Hayden, Ruth Rogers, Stanley Ridges, Frederick Burton and Jack Rockwell, it was released on March 31, 1939, by Paramount Pictures. Silver on the Sage was Hopalong Cassidy series entry number 25.

Plot

Windy (George "Gabby" Hayes) makes the mistake of accusing the buyer, Lazy-J owner Tom Hamilton (Frederick Burton), of the theft, but Lucky (Russell Hayden) suspects the foreman Dave Talbot (Stanley Ridges). Hamilton is murdered, however, and Talbot has the perfect alibi: He was playing cards at the Mirage Bar where Hoppy (William Boyd) had gotten himself a job under the guise of being the noted gambler Bill Thompson. With Talbot not able to be in two places at the same time, the marshal (Jack Rockwell) has no choice but to arrest Lucky for murder.

Cast 
 William Boyd as Hopalong Cassidy
 George "Gabby" Hayes as Windy Halliday 
 Russell Hayden as Lucky Jenkins
 Ruth Rogers as Barbara Hamilton
 Stanley Ridges as Earl Brennan / Dave Talbot
 Frederick Burton as Tom Hamilton
 Jack Rockwell as City Marshal
 Roy Barcroft as Henchman Ewing
 Ed Cassidy as Pierce 
 Wen Wrightas Lane

References

External links 
 
 
 
 

1939 films
American black-and-white films
1930s English-language films
Films directed by Lesley Selander
Paramount Pictures films
American Western (genre) films
1939 Western (genre) films
Hopalong Cassidy films
1930s American films